The 2014 GT Asia Series season was the fifth season of the GT Asia Series championship. It began on 17 May at the Korea International Circuit and ended on 16 November at the Guia Circuit after thirteen races.

Race calendar and results

Championships
Points were awarded as follows:

Drivers Championship
Only the best 11 results count for the drivers championship

Teams Championship

References

External links
Asian Festival Of Speed official website 

GT Asia Series seasons
GT Asia Series
GT Asia Series